Shivinder Mohan Singh is an Indian businessman and erstwhile billionaire with Fortis Healthcare, Religare, and Ranbaxy Laboratories. Singh was the non-executive vice chairman of Fortis Healthcare, an Indian company. He is currently under arrest for criminal breach of trust along with his brother Malvinder Mohan Singh. The two have many cases of fraud registered against them.

Early life
Singh is the son of Dr. Pravinder Singh, and grandson of Bhai Mohan Singh, the founder of Ranbaxy Laboratories, since merged with Sun Pharmaceuticals Ltd (it was earlier a unit of the Japanese drug maker Daiichi Sankyo).

Business career
Singh and his brother Malvinder Mohan Singh inherited their family's 33.5% stake in Ranbaxy after the death of their father in 1999. In April 2015, they were the thirty-fifth richest Indians, with a net worth of $2.5 billion.

Education
Singh attended The Doon School, and then graduated with a BA (hons.) in mathematics from St. Stephen's College, Delhi; he holds an MBA with specialization in health sector management from the Fuqua School of Business of Duke University in the United States.

Personal life
Singh lives in New Delhi with his wife Aditi S. Singh and their four sons. On 24 September, during the AGM of Fortis Hospitals, Singh announced his resignation and handed control of the hospital chain to his brother.

Arrest
As of 1 November 2019, Singh, along with his brother, remains under arrest as his judicial custody has been extended until 14 November 2019. On 12 December 2019, A Delhi court rejected his bail plea in a case related to alleged misappropriation of funds at Religare Finvest Limited (RFL).

References

The Doon School alumni
Indian businesspeople in the pharmaceutical industry
Fuqua School of Business alumni
Indian Sikhs
Living people
Year of birth missing (living people)
Indian businesspeople in the healthcare industry
Former billionaires